The Brock River is a stream on the north bank of the Missisquoi River. The Brock River flows in the municipality of Sutton, in the Brome-Missisquoi Regional County Municipality, in the administrative region of Estrie, in the province of Quebec, in Canada.

Road access to this valley is possible by the Eastman road (attached to the south to the Vallée-Missisquoi road), serving the lower part of this small valley (east side). Forestry is the main activity in this small valley; recreational tourism, second.

The surface of the Brock River is generally frozen from the beginning of December until the end of March; however, safe circulation on the ice is generally done from mid-December to mid-March, except the rapids areas. The water level of the river varies with the seasons and the precipitation; the spring flood occurs in March or April.

Geography 
The Brock River originates at the confluence of mountain streams.

  south-east to a mountain stream (coming from the north-west);
  south-east to a mountain stream (coming from the north-west);
  to the southeast by cutting two forest roads to its mouth 

The Brock River flows on the north bank of the Missisquoi River in the municipality of Sutton, facing the railway (which runs along the south bank of the Missisquoi River) and a mountain.

Toponymy 
The toponym "Brock River" was formalized on September 1, 1983 at the Commission de toponymie du Québec.

See also 
 Brome-Missisquoi Regional County Municipality
 Sutton, a municipality
 Missisquoi River, a stream
 List of rivers of Quebec

Notes and references

External links 

Rivers of Montérégie
Brome-Missisquoi Regional County Municipality